The Economy of Esteem is a book by Geoffrey Brennan and Philip Pettit describing the role of self-esteem and honour in the economy. It was published in 2005 by Oxford University Press.

According to WorldCat, the book is held in 466  libraries   It has been reviewed by in Politics, Philosophy & Economics,    by Bo Rothstein in Perspectives in Politics <ref>[https://www.worldcat.org/oclc/359310768 Bo Rothstein, Perspectives on Politics, 4, no. 4 (2006): 746-747]</ref> in Politische Vierteljahresschrift, in Ethics, in  Journal of Economics,   in Economics and Philosophy,,   in   Journal of European Social Policy,, and in  L'Année sociologique''

According to Brennan, others who have historically paid attention to the role of esteem in motivation range "from Cicero and Polybius through Thomas Aquinas to Hobbes, Locke, Montesquieu, Hume, the American Founding Fathers, Kant, and notably Adam Smith", although Brennan argues that modern 'invisible hand' economics neglects the importance of esteem. Esteem is unique among currencies because it cannot be traded ("esteem is necessarily produced under conditions of autarky") and is subject to the paradox of hedonism.

References

Reputation management
Economics books
2005 non-fiction books
Oxford University Press books